Sectarian violence and/or sectarian strife is a form of communal violence which is inspired by sectarianism, that is, discrimination, hatred or prejudice between different sects of a particular mode of an ideology or different sects of a religion within a nation/community. Religious segregation often plays a role in sectarian violence.

Concept 
According to the Stockholm International Peace Research Institute:

Sectarian violence differs from the concept of race riot. It may involve the dynamics of social polarization, the balkanization of a geographic area along the lines of self-identifying groups, and protracted social conflict.

Some of the possible enabling environments for sectarian violence include power struggles, political climate, social climate, cultural climate, and economic landscape.
Economic conflict: capitalist versus Collectivist anarchism
Political conflict: communist versus nationalist
Interreligious conflict: Christians and/or Catholics versus JewsMuslim versus ChristianMuslim versus Buddhist 
Christian conflict: Catholic versus Protestant
Islamic conflict: Shia versus Sunni

Among Buddhists

In Japan
In the Japanese Middle Ages, different Buddhist sects had private armies that frequently clashed. See Buddhism and violence and warrior monks.

Among Christians

Catholic-Eastern Orthodox

Although the First Crusade was initially launched in response to an appeal from Byzantine Emperor Alexios I Komnenos for help in repelling the invading Seljuq Turks from Anatolia, one of the lasting legacies of the Crusades was to "further separate the Eastern and Western branches of Christianity from each other."

European wars of religion

Following the onset of the Protestant Reformation, a series of wars were waged in Europe starting circa 1524 and continuing intermittently until 1648. Although sometimes unconnected, all of these wars were strongly influenced by the religious change of the period, and the conflict and rivalry that it produced. According to Miroslav Volf, the European wars of religion were a major factor behind the "emergence of secularizing modernity".

In the St. Bartholomew's Day massacre followers of the Roman Catholic Church killed up to 30,000 Huguenots (French Protestants) in mob violence. The massacres were carried out on the national day celebrating Bartholomew the Apostle. Pope Gregory XIII sent the leader of the massacres a Golden Rose, and said that the massacres "gave him more pleasure than fifty Battles of Lepanto, and he commissioned Giorgio Vasari to paint frescoes of it in the Vatican". The killings have been called "the worst of the century's religious massacres", and led to the start of the fourth war of the French Wars of Religion.

Northern Ireland

Since the 16th century there has been sectarian conflict of varying intensity between Roman Catholics and Protestants in Ireland. This religious sectarianism is connected to a degree with nationalism. Northern Ireland has seen inter-communal conflict for more than four centuries and there are records of religious ministers or clerics, the agents for absentee landlords, aspiring politicians, and members of the landed gentry stirring up and capitalizing on sectarian hatred and violence back as far as the late 18th century.

William E.H. Lecky, an Irish historian, wrote in 1892 that, "If the characteristic mark of a healthy Christianity be to unite its members by a bond of fraternity and love, then there is no country where Christianity has more completely failed than Ireland".

Steve Bruce, a sociologist, wrote;

John Hickey wrote;

The period from 1969 to 1998 is known as "The Troubles", a period of frequent violence and tense relations between Northern Ireland's communities. About one in eight females and one in five males in Northern Ireland identified themselves as belonging to no religion. However, people of no religion and non-Christian faiths are still considered  as belonging to one of the two "sects" along with churchgoers. People of no religion are less likely to support the main, constitution-oriented main political parties, or more likely to support a more neutral political party such as the Alliance Party of Northern Ireland.

About two-thirds of people with no religion tend to think of themselves as neither unionist or nationalist, although a much higher percentage of those with no religion tend to think of themselves as unionist than nationalist.

For people who describe themselves as Protestant or Roman Catholic, a small majority of them appear to favour one of the two main political parties on either side: the Democratic Unionist Party or the Ulster Unionist Party for Protestants; and Sinn Féin or the Social Democratic and Labour Party for Roman Catholics. In each case, the percentage in the Northern Irish Life & Times Survey in 2015 was 57%. Roman Catholics are more likely to reject the label British (59%) than Protestants are to reject the label Irish (48%).

Protestants are more likely to consider the British identity as the 'best' single way to describe themselves, at 67%, with Roman Catholics close behind at 63% who consider the best single way to describe themselves as Irish. There is an equal level of support for the more neutral Northern Irish identity, with 25% of people from each religion likely to choose that label as the best description. Over a third of people with no religion prefer to be described as Northern Irish.

There are organizations dedicated to the reduction of sectarianism in Northern Ireland. The Corrymeela Community (in Ballycastle, County Antrim), operates a retreat centre on the northern coast of Northern Ireland to bring Catholics and Protestants together to discuss their differences and similarities. The Ulster Project works with teenagers from Northern Ireland and the United States to provide safe, non-denominational environments to discuss sectarianism in Northern Ireland. These organizations are attempting to bridge the gap of historical prejudice between the two religious communities.

Although state schools in Northern Ireland are non-denominational, most Catholic parents still send their children to specifically Catholic schools or Irish-language medium schools, thus ensuring that state school students are almost wholly Protestant. There are some integrated schools and the Society of Friends (Quakers) have long been an advocate of co-education in terms of religion, operating the Friends' School in Lisburn (first established in 1774).

Yugoslav wars

Howard Goeringer criticizes both the "Catholic Pope and the Orthodox Patriarch" for failing to condemn the "deliberate massacre of men, women and children in the name of 'ethnic cleansing' as incompatible with Jesus' life and teaching."

Rwandan genocide

The majority of Rwandans, and Tutsis in particular, are Catholic, so shared religion did not prevent genocide. Miroslav Volf cites a Roman Catholic bishop from Rwanda as saying, "The best cathechists, those who filled our churches on Sundays, were the first to go with machetes in their hands". Ian Linden asserts that "there is absolutely no doubt that significant numbers of prominent Christians were involved in sometimes slaughtering their own church leaders." According to Volf, "what is particularly disturbing about the complicity of the church is that Rwanda is without doubt one of Africa’s most evangelized nations. Eight out of ten of its people claimed to be Christians."

When the Roman Catholic missionaries came to Rwanda in the late 1880s, they contributed to the "Hamitic" theory of race origins, which taught that the Tutsi were a superior race. The Church has been considered to have played a significant role in fomenting racial divisions between Hutu and Tutsi, in part because they found more willing converts among the majority Hutu. The Organisation of African Unity (OAU) report on the genocide states,

In the colonial era, under German and then Belgian rule, Roman Catholic missionaries, inspired by the overtly racist theories of 19th century Europe, concocted a destructive ideology of ethnic cleavage and racial ranking that attributed superior qualities to the country's Tutsi minority, since the missionaries ran the colonial-era schools, these pernicious values were systematically transmitted to several generations of Rwandans...

The Roman Catholic Church argues that those who took part in the genocide did so without the sanction of the Church. Although the genocide was ethnically motivated and religious factors were not prominent, Human Rights Watch reported that a number of religious authorities in Rwanda, particularly Roman Catholic, failed to condemn the genocide publicly at the time.

Some Christian leaders have been convicted by the International Criminal Tribunal for Rwanda for their roles in the genocide. These include Rwandan Roman Catholic priests and nuns as well as a Seventh-day Adventist Church pastor.

Scotland

Scotland suffers from a spill-over of sectarianism, largely owing to the Troubles in neighbouring Northern Ireland as many people, particularly in the West of Scotland, have links to Northern Ireland by genealogy or immigration.

Scotland's two largest and best supported football clubs—Glasgow Rangers, which, for many generations, has largely been identified with Protestants and unionism, and Glasgow Celtic, which, since its founding in the late 19th century, has been identified with Roman Catholics and Irish nationalism or republicanism—both subscribe, with varying degrees of success, to government initiatives and charities like the Nil by Mouth campaign are working in this area.

Celtic previously sent letters to every season ticket holder reminding supporters that no form of sectarianism is welcome at Celtic Park. Rangers' anti-sectarian policy is called Follow With Pride.

Among Muslims

Sectarian violence between the two major sects of Islam, Shia and Sunni, has occurred in countries like Pakistan, Iraq, Afghanistan, Bahrain, Lebanon etc. This violent conflict has roots in the political turmoil arising out of differences over the succession to Muhammad. Abu Bakr, a companion of Muhammad, was nominated by Umar and elected as the first Sunni Rightly Guided Caliph. However another group felt that Ali, the cousin and son-in-law of Muhammad, had been designated by Muhammad and is considered by Shia as the first Imam.

According to Sunnis, Abu Bakr was followed by Umar as caliph of the Rashidun Caliphate, then by Uthman ibn Affan and finally by Ali. Ali's right to rule was challenged by Muawiyah bin Abu Sufian, governor of Syria, who believed that Ali should have acted faster against the murderers of Uthman. The situation deteriorated further when many of those responsible for the death of Uthman rallied behind Ali. However, later on, both the parties agreed to have some one as a judge between them. This led to the separation of an extremist group known as Kharijites from Ali's army, which pronounced the judgement belonged to God alone. A member of this group later assassinated Ali. By breaching, Hasan-Muawiyah Treaty, Muawiyah appointed his son Yazid as his successor. The credentials and rule of Yazid were challenged by Ali's son Hussein ibn Ali (and grandson of Muhammad). A battle at Karbala in Iraq led to the martyrdom of Hussein and dozens of others from Ahl al-Bayt (the members of the family of Muhammad).

This tragic incident created deep fissures in the Muslim society. The conflict that had started at a political plane intervened with the dogma and belief systems. Those who consider Ali to be the true heir to the Muhammad are known as "Shia" referring to Shian-e-Ali. The other Muslims are known as "Sunni" meaning "followers of the Traditions of The Prophet".

In Iraq

In February 2006, a full-scale civil war erupted in Iraq, when violence between the two Muslim rival sects erupted. It has left tens of thousands to hundred thousands of people dead and dozens of mosques and homes destroyed.

In Pakistan

In Pakistan sectarianism exhibited its first organized nature in early 1980 when two rival organizations were established: Tehrik-e-Jafaria (TFJ) (Organization of the Jafri (Shia) Law) represented Shia communities, and Sipah-e-Sahaba Pakistan (SSP) (Guardian of the Companions of the Prophet) representing Sunnis. The first major incident of this sectarian violence was killing of the Arif Hussain Hussaini, founding leader of TFJ in 1986.

In retaliation Haq Nawaz Jhangvi, founder of the (SSP) was murdered. Since then internecine bloody vendetta has ensued. The focus of this violence has been Kurram, Hangu, Dera Ismail Khan, Bahawalpur, Jhang, Quetta,Gigit- Baltistan and Karachi.

The transformation of the sectarian conflict to a violent civil war in Pakistan coincided with the establishment of the Islamic republic in Iran and promotion of the Sunni religion and its incorporation in the state institutions by General Muhammad Zia-ul-Haq, regime in Pakistan.

The Iranian Revolution was led by Shia clerics, and it influenced Shia communities all over the world. In Pakistan Tehrik-e-Jafaria was established with the demands of enforcing the Sharia Law.  This demand was viewed as detrimental by the Sunni religious leaders. In response SSP was established by the Sunni extremist clerics. Many of these clerics had a background in the sectarian strife against the Ahmadis (a heterodox sect considered non-Muslim by majority of the Muslims)

In Somalia
Ahlu Sunna Waljama'a is a Somali paramilitary group consisting of Sufis and moderates opposed to the radical Islamist group Al-Shabaab. They are fighting in order to prevent Wahhabism from being imposed on Somalia and to protect the country's Sunni-Sufi traditions and generally moderate religious views.

In Syria

The Syrian civil war gradually shifted towards a more sectarian nature. Pro-Assad militant groups are largely Shia, while anti-Assad militant groups are Sunni.

In Yemen

In Yemen, there have been many clashes between Sunnis and Shia Houthis. According to The Washington Post, "In today’s Middle East, activated sectarianism affects the political cost of alliances, making them easier between co-religionists. That helps explain why Sunni-majority states are lining up against Iran, Iraq and Hezbollah over Yemen."

See also
 List of countries by discrimination and violence against minorities
 Social cohesion
 Hooliganism

Examples
 La Violencia in Colombia
 [[Communalism (South Asia)]]
 Cypriot intercommunal violence
 Religious violence in India
 Caste-related violence in India
 2005 French riots
 2005 Cronulla riots
 2006 Brussels riots
 2009 Boko Haram Uprising
 2009 Gojra riots
 Rohingya conflict

References 

 
Religion and violence
Sectarianism